The Tarikh i Yamini, or Kitab i Yamini, written in Arabic in an embellished, flowery rhetorical rhymed prose, is a history of the reigns of Sebuktigin and Mahmud.

Written by the historian Abu Nasr Muhammad ibn Muhammad al Jabbaru-l 'Utbi (or al-Utbi).  His work comprises the whole of the reign of Sebuktigin, and part of that of Mahmud, down to the year 410 Hijra (1020 AD). The Tarikh Yamini also contains information chronicling Sultan Mahmud's expeditions as well as the end of the Samanid Empire. Al-Utbi, being Mahmud's secretary, did not accompany the sultan, therefore his topography is deficient and his writing style consists of an explicit orthodox nature. He also states that he intentionally suppressed many events, unnatural or strange that he found skeptical that did not fit the objectives he had set down in the preface.

Content
The Tarikh Yamini starts in 965 CE, but the Samanids are not mentioned until Nuh ibn Mansur's reign in 976, while it goes into detail about the Buyids prior to 983. During the Qarakhanid invasion of the Samanid kingdom in 991, the Tarikh Yamini states that the Samanid governor Fa'iq, son of Simjurid Abu'l-Hasan Simjuri, invited Hasan b. Sulayman{Bughra Khan} to invade Bukhara.

Al-Utbi gives contradictory information owing to the names and number of Farighunid rulers. Specifically never naming, Abu'l Haret Muhammad, the second Farighunid ruler.

Al-Utbi states when Sebuktigin defeated Jayapala in 988, the Afghans and Khaljis of the territory he conquered between Lamghan and Peshawar surrendered and agreed to serve him. Iqtidar Husain Siddiqui citing the  13th century Persian translation, claims that Al-Utbi mentions the "Afghans" were pagans given to rapine and rapacity, they were defeated and converted to Islam.

Though, plagued by incorrect dates and incorrect topography, the Tarikh Yamini does contain valuable information concerning Sultan Mahmud's invasions of India.

On Mahmud's 12th expedition to India in 1018–1019, the Tarikh i Yamini states, he brought back so many slaves that, "merchants came from distant cities to purchase them, so that the countries Ma wara' an nahr (central Asia), Iraq and Khurasan were filled with them, and the fair and the dark, the rich and the poor, mingled in one common slavery.".

Early translations
The 13th century Persian translation of the Tarikh i Yamini, by Jurbadqani, takes many liberties and introduces images not found in the original and can be considered an independent work of art; however, it is a fairly reliable copy of the narrative.

Modern era
The Tarikh i Yamini was translated from Persian into English in 1858 by James Reynolds under the title, Kitab-i-Yamini.

References

Sources

History books about Afghanistan
History of the Turkic peoples
History books about India
History books about Pakistan
Ghaznavid Empire
Arabic literature
Historiography of India